Sanjeev Bikhchandani is an Indian  businessman, who is the founder and executive vice chairman of Info Edge which owns Naukri.com, a job portal, as well as the co-founder of Ashoka University. He was given the Padma Shri Award, the fourth Highest civilian award in India, in January 2020.

He attended St. Columba's School, Delhi and finished schooling from there in 1981. There after, he obtained a Bachelor of Arts degree in economics from St. Stephen's College, Delhi in 1984. He completed his MBA from IIMA in 1989. He is ranked #68 in Forbes India Rich List 2020 with a net worth of $2.1 Billion.

Career 
Sanjeev after his PG left a job marketing Horlicks at Hindustan Milkfood Manufacturers (after series of multinational mergers-and-acquisitions, now known as GlaxoSmithKline Consumer Healthcare India) in 1990 to pursue entrepreneurship. Sanjeev founded Info Edge in 1995. In 1997, Bikhchandani set up Naukri.com, jobs portal located on a server in India, and later Quadrangle.in, an offline executive search business. In 2005, Naukri.com was reported as being India's largest web-based employment site.

Building up in the websites business, Info Edge later launched other classified sites like 99acres.com in real estate, Jeevansathi.com in matrimony and Shiksha.com in education.

He is also an astute investor, having invested in unicorns like PolicyBazaar and Zomato. Additionally, he is a part of the 'Vision Circle' of FYI (Foundation for Young Innovators) - a shark tank for social initiatives exclusively open to high school students.

He won the Ernst and Young Entrepreneur of the Year Award in 2008.

References

Living people
St. Stephen's College, Delhi alumni
Indian Institute of Management Ahmedabad alumni
Businesspeople from Uttar Pradesh
St. Columba's School, Delhi alumni
People from Noida
Year of birth missing (living people)
Recipients of the Padma Shri in trade and industry